Archie Noel Brennan (born 16 October 2000) is an English professional footballer who plays as a midfielder for Cirencester Town.

Career
Brennan joined Cheltenham Town at under-9 level, previously playing for Brockworth and Abbeymead Rovers. In May 2019, Brennan signed a professional contract with Cheltenham, after playing on loan for non-league sides Lydney Town and Slimbridge during the 2018–19 season, making three and twelve appearances respectively. On 3 September 2019, Brennan made his Cheltenham debut in a 1–0 EFL Trophy defeat against Exeter City.

In October 2019, Brennan moved on loan to Worcestershire-based side Alvechurch.

References

2000 births
Living people
Footballers from Gloucester
Association football midfielders
English footballers
Cheltenham Town F.C. players
Lydney Town A.F.C. players
Slimbridge A.F.C. players
Alvechurch F.C. players
Cirencester Town F.C. players